Voo Voo is a Polish rock band formed in 1985.

Band members
 Wojciech Waglewski – guitar, main vocals, and lyrics. Founder and leader of the band; its name comes from his initials (the English pronunciation of "Voo Voo" sounds like Polish pronunciation of "W.W."). Father of Bartosz Waglewski and Piotr Waglewski, better known as Fisz and Emade. He also plays with the bands "Osjan" and "Gaia".
 Mateusz Pospieszalski – saxophone, flute, bass clarinet, keyboard instruments, accordion, vocals. He also played with the band "Maanam". Currently playing with the bands "Tie Break" and "GRAAL", also Stanisław Sojka.
 Piotr "Stopa" Żyżelewicz (died 12 May 2011) – drums. He cooperated with the bands Armia and Izrael and 2Tm2,3.
 Karim Martusewicz – double bass, bass guitar, has played with Voo Voo since February 1998.
 Mamadou Diouf from Senegal – vocals. He has been cooperating with Voo Voo since 1994.

Discography

Studio albums

Video albums

References

External links

Polish rock music groups
Musical groups established in 1985
1985 establishments in Poland